Patelco Credit Union is a member owned, not-for-profit credit union that serves Northern California, particularly the San Francisco Bay Area.  Founded in 1936, it is one of the oldest and largest credit unions in the country. With more than $9 billion in assets, it is the 22nd largest credit union in the country.

History
Patelco Credit Union once served an organization formally known as Pacific Telephone & Telegraph Company (now known as AT&T). However, in 1983 it opened its doors to the public and now operates 37 branches in Northern California. It provides services in the form of deposits, lending, investments, and insurance.

References

External links 
 

Credit unions based in California
Banks established in 1936
Economy of the San Francisco Bay Area